or  is a Noh play of the fourth category, probably from the 16th century, and possibly by Kongō Yagorō.

Theme
An absentee husband and father sets in motion a chain of events whereby the steward left in charge of the family estate gradually exerts power over the mother and her son, Hanawaka.

Eventually the pair are forced into the demeaning activity of bird-scaring from a boat among the ricefields.

See also

Take no yuki

References

External links 
 Tori-oi-bune: Picture

Noh
Noh plays